Elections to the Almaty Regional Mäslihat was held on 10 January 2021 to elect the members of the 7th Almaty Regional Mäslihat. The election coincided with the 2021 Kazakh local elections and for the first time taken place under the newly proportional representational system.

The Nur Otan (NO) won a majority of 37 out of 45 seats in the mäslihat followed by the Auyl People's Democratic Patriotic Party (AUYL) and People's Party of Kazakhstan (QHP) in which both parties earned 4 seats while 2 other parties failed to pass the electoral threshold to have any presence in the mäslihat.

Background 
A new law on local elections was enacted in 2018, which allowed for mäslihat seats to be allocated through party-list proportional representation.

After the announcement of the election date in October 2020 which scheduled all local races to coincide with the legislative elections, the Nur Otan on 16 November 2020 unveiled its list of 90 party members whom were contesting seats for the Almaty Regional Mäslihat despite having only 45 seats, as well as electoral platform for the region which aimed at improving all spheres of human activity, at ensuring an economically sustainable zone, a socially oriented region, open and accountable local bodies, at developing leisure and employment for young people, at preserving the history and culture of the region.

Parties 
All 5 contesting parties submitted their lists to the Almaty Regional Electoral Commission which included:

Results

References 

Elections in Almaty Region
2021 elections in Kazakhstan
January 2021 events in Kazakhstan